was a counselor of the third rank in the Imperial court of Japan.  The role dates to the 7th century.  This advisory position remained a part of the Imperial court of Japan from the 8th century until the Meiji period in the 19th century.  This became a Taihō Code office in the early feudal Japanese government or daijō-kan.

In the ranks of the Imperial bureaucracy, the Shōnagon came between the Chūnagon (middle counselors) and the Sangi (associate counselors).

Typically, the office was held by three fifth-rank members of the kuge.  These officials were responsible for reading ordinary reports and for making of Imperial travel arrangements. The Shōnagon are said to help the memories of the principal officers, to put seals to deeds, and carry communications to others within the daijō-kan.  They are both military and civil.

Shōnagon in context
Any exercise of meaningful powers of court officials in the pre-Meiji period reached its nadir during the years of the Tokugawa shogunate, and yet the core structures of ritsuryō government did manage to endure for centuries.

In order to appreciate the office of Shōnagon, it is necessary to evaluate its role in the traditional Japanese context of a durable yet flexible framework.  This was a bureaucratic network and a hierarchy of functionaries.  The role of Shōnagon was an important element in the  Daijō-kan (Council of State). The Daijō-kan  schema proved to be adaptable in the creation of constitutional government in the modern period.

Highest Daijō-kan officials
The highest positions in the court hierarchy can be cataloged.  A dry list provides a superficial glimpse inside the complexity and inter-connected relationships of the Imperial court structure.
  Daijō-daijin (Chancellor of the Realm or Chief Minister). 
  Sadaijin (Minister of the Left).
  Udaijin (Minister of the Right).
  Naidaijin (Minister of the Center).

The next highest tier of officials were:
  Dainagon (Major counselor). There are commonly three Dainagon;  sometimes more.
  Chūnagon (Middle counselor).
  Shōnagon (Minor counselor); there are commonly three Shōnagon.

Other high-ranking bureaucrats who function somewhat flexibly within the Daijō-kan were; 
  Sangi (Associate counselor).      This office functions as a manager of Daijō-kan activities within the palace.
   (Secretariat).  These are specifically named men who act at the sole discretion of the emperor.

The Eight Ministries
The government ministries were eight semi-independent bureaucracies.  A list alone cannot reveal much about the actual functioning of the Daijō-kan, but the broad hierarchical categories do suggest the way in which governmental functions were parsed:

The specific ministries above are not grouped arbitrarily. The two court officials below had responsibility for them as follows:
   This administrator was charged or tasked with supervising four ministries: Center, Civil Services, Ceremonies, and Taxation.
   This administrator was charged or tasked with supervising four ministries: Military, Justice, Treasury and Imperial Household.

See also
 Daijō-kan
 Sessho and Kampaku
 Kōkyū
 Kuge
 Imperial Household Agency

Notes

References
 Nussbaum, Louis-Frédéric and Käthe Roth. (2005).  Japan encyclopedia. Cambridge: Harvard University Press. ; 
 Ozaki, Yukio. (2001). The Autobiography of Ozaki Yukio: The Struggle for Constitutional Government in Japan. (Translated by Fujiko Hara). Princeton: Princeton University Press. ; 
 Ozaki, Yukio. (1955). 尾崎咢堂全集. 第11卷, 咢堂自伝: 日本憲政史を語る (Ozaki gakudō zenshū. 11, Gakudō jiden: nihon kenseishi o kataru) Tokyo: Kōronsha. 
 Titsingh, Isaac. (1834). Nihon Odai Ichiran; ou,  Annales des empereurs du Japon.  Paris: Royal Asiatic Society, Oriental Translation Fund of Great Britain and Ireland. . 
 Varley, H. Paul. (1980). Jinnō Shōtōki: A Chronicle of Gods and Sovereigns. New York: Columbia University Press. ; 

Government of feudal Japan
702 establishments
8th-century establishments in Japan